The Dannebrog Islands are a group of islands and rocks lying between the Wauwermans Islands and the Vedel Islands in the Wilhelm Archipelago.

The Wilhelm Archipelago was first sighted and named by a German expedition under Eduard Dallmann, 1873–74, and was resighted and the whole archipelago named the Dannebrog Islands by the Belgian Antarctic Expedition, 1897–99, under Gerlache, in appreciation of support given to Gerlache by Denmark. Dallmann's original naming has been retained for the archipelago, and the name Dannebrog restricted to the smaller group here described.

Islands in the group 

 Akula Island
 Bodloperka Island
 Elisabethinsel
 Greblo Island
 Hoatsin Island
 Kalmar Island
 Kosatka Island
 Lamantin Island
 Mechka Island
 Meduza Island
 Mishka Island
 Padpadak Island
 Pegas Island
 Peperuda Island
 Raketa Island
 Rog Island
 Shut Island
 Skoba Island
 Sprey Island
 Stego Island
 Taralezh Island
 Tigan Island
 Tyulen Island
 Yastreb Island

See also 
 List of Antarctic and sub-Antarctic islands

References
 

Islands of the Wilhelm Archipelago